Synodontis is the largest genus of mochokid catfishes. It is the biggest genus within the 10 genera and 190 different species in the family Mochokidae. Synodontis has over 131 different species within the genus. Synodontis are also known as squeakers, due to their ability to make stridulatory sounds through their pectoral fin spines when handled or disturbed. Synodontis make a sound that sounds like squeaking by rubbing their spines together.  They do this when they have been frightened or when they become angry. Synodontis may also squeak when they are taken out of the water. These catfish are small- to medium-sized fish with many species exhibiting attractive spotted markings. Some species are also known for naturally swimming belly-up, earning the name upside-down catfish. Some of these species are Synodontis contractus and Synodontis nigriventris. While some of these species are known to swim upside down, another species, Synodontis multipunctatus, is a brood parasitic cuckoo catfish,there are two other species Synodontis petricola and Synodontis grandiops are also called brood parasitic cuckoo catfish.

Distribution

Synodontis is a freshwater catfish that is most commonly found throughout Africa, occurring mostly in Central and West Africa. Synodontis is the most widely distributed mochokidae genus, occurring throughout most of the freshwaters of sub-Saharan Africa and the Nile River system. They can live in freshwaters which can be creeks, ponds, streams, lakes, and rivers. Their distribution is similar to that of cichlid fishes, however, unlike cichlids the majority of their diversity occurs in rivers not lakes.

Evolutionary history
Synodontis catfish form a small endemic radiation in Lake Tanganyika, which includes the non-endemic species S. victoriae. This radiation is thought to have evolved relatively recently (~5.5. Million years ago), having diversified within full lacustrine conditions. This is also the case for other endemic Lake Tanganyika lineages such as mastacembelid eels and platythelphusid crabs for example. Lake Tanganyikan Synodontis have also been shown to be Müllerian mimics, and that at least one species (Synodontis multipunctatus) is a brood parasite.

Fossil record
The earliest fossils of Synodontis in East African are from the Early Miocene. Many Synodontis fossils are the spines because they are very sturdy and so they are preserved better. The fossils of spines that are found are used to determine the family or genera of the fish but it cannot determine the species. Synodontis species that have survived and are still living can be identified by the shape of their whisker like organs on their heads called barbels, which relate to touch.  The can also be identified by the color of their skin, the skull bones, and the number and length of the teeth.

Ecology
Synodontis species are omnivorous generalists, feeding on a wide spectrum of different foods and are largely unspecialized. Insects, crustaceans, mollusks, annelids, seeds, and algae have been found in the stomachs of different species of Synodontis. They are bottom-feeders and may be detritivores, some species may also be able to adapt to filter feeding. This allows them to cope with seasonal and habitat changes and gives them a better ability to colonize different habitats. Different Synodontis species have somewhat different growth rates but most of them are fairly similar. Females of a species are generally larger than the males. There is a great increase in growth the first year in both male and female and then the growth slows down as they become older. The form and structure of these fish are very different compared to other fish. The size and shape of the mouth are distinct because of its ventral mouth and these fish usually are triangular or cylindrical when looking at it from the side. Not much is known about the reproduction in these fish. It has been determined that July to October is when they spawn and that they swim in pairs during this spawning time. Species of Synodontis have been noted to reproduce with the flooding period of the rainy season.

Relationship to humans

Many Synodontis species are prized ornamental fish in the fishkeeping hobby.  While some of the Synodontis species are prized because of their color or behavior, other species are wanted for food.  Some of the bigger species in the genus are important food sources for the people in Africa.

Species
There are currently 131 recognized species in this genus: Synodontis accounts for about one-quarter of African catfish species. This genus has more members than any other African teleost genus other than Barbus and Haplochromis.

Newer species are listed with references.

 Synodontis acanthomias Boulenger, 1899
 Synodontis acanthoperca Friel & Vigliotta, 2006
 Synodontis afrofischeri Hilgendorf, 1888 (Fischer's Victoria squeaker)
 Synodontis alberti Schilthuis, 1891 (Bigeye squeaker)
 Synodontis albolineatus Pellegrin, 1924
 Synodontis angelicus Schilthuis, 1891 (Angel squeaker)
 Synodontis annectens Boulenger, 1911
 Synodontis ansorgii Boulenger, 1911
 Synodontis arnoulti Román, 1966
 Synodontis aterrimus Poll & Roberts, 1968
 Synodontis bastiani Daget, 1948
 Synodontis batensoda Rüppell, 1832 (Upsidedown catfish)
 Synodontis batesii Boulenger, 1907
 Synodontis brichardi Poll, 1959
 Synodontis budgetti Boulenger, 1911
 Synodontis camelopardalis Poll, 1971
 Synodontis carineae Vreven & Ibala Zamba, 2011
 Synodontis caudalis Boulenger, 1899
 Synodontis caudovittatus Boulenger, 1901
 Synodontis centralis Poll, 1971
 Synodontis clarias (Linnaeus, 1758) (Mandi)
 Synodontis comoensis Daget & Lévêque, 1981
 Synodontis congicus Poll, 1971
 Synodontis contractus Vinciguerra, 1928 (Bugeye squeaker)
 Synodontis courteti Pellegrin, 1906
 Synodontis cuangoanus Poll, 1971
 Synodontis decorus Boulenger, 1899 (Clown squeaker)
 Synodontis dekimpei Paugy, 1987
 Synodontis depauwi Boulenger, 1899
 Synodontis dhonti Boulenger, 1917
 Synodontis dorsomaculatus Poll, 1971
 Synodontis eupterus Boulenger, 1901 (Featherfin squeaker)
 Synodontis filamentosus Boulenger, 1901
 Synodontis flavitaeniatus Boulenger, 1919 (Orangestriped squeaker)
 Synodontis frontosus Vaillant, 1895
 Synodontis fuelleborni Hilgendorf & Pappenheim, 1903 (Fuelleborn's squeaker)
 Synodontis geledensis Günther, 1896 (Geledi squeaker)
 Synodontis gobroni Daget, 1954
 Synodontis grandiops Wright & Page, 2006
 Synodontis granulosus Boulenger, 1900
 Synodontis greshoffi Schilthuis, 1891
 Synodontis guttatus Günther, 1865
 Synodontis haugi Pellegrin, 1906
 Synodontis ilebrevis Wright & Page, 2006
 Synodontis irsacae Matthes, 1959
 Synodontis iturii Steindachner, 1911
 Synodontis katangae Poll, 1971
 Synodontis khartoumensis Abu Gideiri, 1967
 Synodontis koensis Pellegrin, 1933
 Synodontis kogonensis Musschoot & Lalèyè, 2008
 Synodontis laessoei Norman, 1923
 Synodontis leopardinus Pellegrin, 1914 (Leopard squeaker)
 Synodontis leopardus Pfeffer, 1896
 Synodontis levequei Paugy, 1987
 Synodontis longirostris Boulenger, 1902
 Synodontis longispinis Pellegrin, 1930
 Synodontis lucipinnis Wright & Page, 2006
 Synodontis lufirae Poll, 1971
 Synodontis macrophthalmus Poll, 1971
 Synodontis macrops Greenwood, 1963
 Synodontis macropunctatus Wright & Page, 2008
 Synodontis macrostigma Boulenger, 1911 (Largespot squeaker)
 Synodontis macrostoma Skelton & White, 1990 (Largemouth squeaker)
 Synodontis manni De Vos, 2001 (Feather-barbelled squeaker)
 Synodontis marmoratus Lönnberg, 1895
 Synodontis matthesi Poll, 1971
 Synodontis melanopterus Boulenger, 1903
 Synodontis melanostictus Boulenger, 1906
 Synodontis membranacea (Geoffroy Saint-Hilaire, 1809)
 Synodontis multimaculatus Boulenger, 1902
 Synodontis multipunctatus Boulenger, 1898 (Cuckoo catfish)
 Synodontis nebulosus Peters, 1852 (Cloudy squeaker)
 Synodontis ngouniensis De Weirdt, Vreven & Fermon, 2008
 Synodontis nigrita Valenciennes, 1840
 Synodontis nigriventris David, 1936 (Blotched upsidedown catfish)
 Synodontis nigromaculatus Boulenger, 1905 (Blackspotted squeaker)
 Synodontis njassae Keilhack, 1908 (Malawi squeaker)
 Synodontis notatus Vaillant, 1893 (Onespot squeaker)
 Synodontis nummifer Boulenger, 1899
 Synodontis obesus Boulenger, 1898
 Synodontis ocellifer Boulenger, 1900
 Synodontis omias Günther, 1864
 Synodontis orientalis Seegers, 2008
 Synodontis ornatipinnis Boulenger, 1899
 Synodontis ornatissimus Gosse, 1982
 Synodontis ouemeensis Musschoot & Lalèyè, 2008
 Synodontis pardalis Boulenger, 1908
 Synodontis petricola Matthes, 1959 (Cuckoo Catfish)
 Synodontis pleurops Boulenger, 1897 (Congo squeaker)
 Synodontis polli Gosse, 1982
 Synodontis polyodon Vaillant, 1895
 Synodontis polystigma Boulenger, 1915
 Synodontis pulcher Poll, 1971
 Synodontis punctifer Daget, 1965
 Synodontis punctulatus Günther, 1889
 Synodontis punu Vreven & Milondo, 2009
 Synodontis rebeli Holly, 1926
 Synodontis resupinatus Boulenger, 1904
 Synodontis ricardoae Seegers, 1996 (Ricardo's squeaker)
 Synodontis robbianus Smith, 1875
 Synodontis robertsi Poll, 1974
 Synodontis ruandae Matthes, 1959
 Synodontis rufigiensis Bailey, 1968
 Synodontis rukwaensis Hilgendorf & Pappenheim, 1903 (Lake Rukwa squeaker)
 Synodontis schall (Bloch & Schneider, 1801) (Wahrindi)
 Synodontis schoutedeni David, 1936
 Synodontis serpentis Whitehead, 1962 (Tana squeaker)
 Synodontis serratus Rüppell, 1829
 Synodontis smiti Boulenger, 1902
 Synodontis soloni Boulenger, 1899
 Synodontis sorex Günther, 1864
 Synodontis steindachneri Boulenger, 1913
 Synodontis tanganyicae Borodin, 1936
 Synodontis tessmanni Pappenheim, 1911
 Synodontis thamalakanensis Fowler, 1935
 Synodontis thysi Poll, 1971
 Synodontis tourei Daget, 1962
 Synodontis unicolor Boulenger, 1915
 Synodontis vaillanti Boulenger, 1897
 Synodontis vanderwaali Skelton & White, 1990
 Synodontis velifer Norman, 1935
 Synodontis vermiculatus Daget, 1954
 Synodontis victoriae Boulenger, 1906 (Lake Victoria squeaker)
 Synodontis violaceus Pellegrin, 1919
 Synodontis voltae Román, 1975
 Synodontis waterloti Daget, 1962
 Synodontis woleuensis Friel & Sullivan, 2008
 Synodontis woosnami Boulenger, 1911 (Upper Zambezi squeaker)
 Synodontis xiphias Günther, 1864
 Synodontis zambezensis Peters, 1852 (Plain squeaker)
 Synodontis zanzibaricus Peters, 1868 (Eastcoast squeaker)

References

 
Fish of Africa
Catfish genera
Taxa named by Georges Cuvier
Freshwater fish genera